The active reflection coefficient (ARC) is the reflection coefficient for a single antenna element in an array antenna, in the presence of mutual coupling. The active reflection coefficient is a function of frequency in addition to the excitation of the neighboring cells. In computational electromagnetics, the active reflection coefficient is usually determined from unit cell analysis in the frequency domain, where the phase shift over the unit cell (progressive phase shift used to steer the beam) is applied as a boundary condition.
It has been suggested that the name "scan reflection coefficient" is more appropriate than "active reflection coefficient", however the latter remains the most commonly used name.

Mathematical description

General case 
The ARC for antenna element  in an array of  elements is calculated by:

Linear array with specified scan angle 

In a linear array with inter element spacing , uniform amplitude tapering and scan angle , the following excitation coefficients are used: . By inserting this expression into the general equation above, we obtain:

See also 
 Total active reflection coefficient
 Array antenna

References 

Antennas (radio)